The 2018–19 William & Mary Tribe men's basketball team represented the College of William & Mary during the 2018–19 NCAA Division I men's basketball season. The Tribe, coached by 16th-year head coach Tony Shaver, played their home games at Kaplan Arena in Williamsburg, Virginia as members of the Colonial Athletic Association. Street & Smith's preseason basketball preview rated William & Mary with the toughest schedule in the CAA.

Previous season
The Tribe finished the 2017–18 season 19–12, 11–7 in CAA play to finish in fourth place. They defeated Towson in the quarterfinals of the CAA tournament before losing in the semifinals to College of Charleston.

Offseason

Departures

Incoming transfers

Under NCAA transfer rules, Andy Van Vliet will have to sit out for the 2018–19 season, and will have one year of remaining eligibility.

2018 recruiting class

2019 recruiting class

Roster

Honors and awards

Street & Smith's Preseason All Colonial  
Nathan Knight

Athlon Sports Preseason All CAA 2nd Team 
Nathan Knight
Justin Pierce

Lindy's Sports Preseason All Conference 1st Team 
Nathan Knight

Lindy's Sports Preseason Best Shooter 
Matt Milon

Lindy's Sports Preseason Best NBA Prospect 
Nathan Knight

Schedule and results 

|-
!colspan=9 style=| Non-conference regular season

|-
!colspan=9 style=| CAA regular season

|-
!colspan=9 style=| CAA Tournament

Source:

References

William And Mary
William & Mary Tribe men's basketball seasons
William and Mary Tribe men's basketball
William and Mary